Trade unions in the United Kingdom were first decriminalised under the recommendation of a Royal commission in 1867, which agreed that the establishment of the organisations was to the advantage of both employers and employees. Legalised in 1871, the Trade Union Movement sought to reform socio-economic conditions for working men in British industries, and the trade unions' search for this led to the creation of a Labour Representation Committee which effectively formed the basis for today's Labour Party, which still has extensive links with the Trade Union Movement in Britain. Margaret Thatcher's governments weakened the powers of the unions in the 1980s, in particular by making it more difficult to strike legally, and some within the British trades union movement criticised Tony Blair's Labour government for not reversing some of Thatcher's changes. Most British unions are members of the TUC, the Trades Union Congress (founded in 1867), or where appropriate, the Scottish Trades Union Congress or the Irish Congress of Trade Unions, which are the country's principal national trade union centres.

Membership declined steeply in the 1980s and 1990s, falling from 13 million in 1979 to around 7.3 million in 2000. In September 2012 union membership dropped below 6 million for the first time since the 1940s. Union membership has since begun rising gradually again, reaching 6.44 million in 2019.

History

Law

Much like corporations,  trade unions were regarded as criminal until the Combination Act 1825, and were regarded as quasi-legal organisations, subjected to the restraint of trade doctrine, until the Trade Union Act 1871. This Act abolished common-law restrictions, but took an abstentionist stance to unions' internal affairs. The Trade Disputes Act 1906 exempted trade-union funds from liability in action for damages for torts, and this freedom gave future union pickets a great deal of power.

Democratic organisation
The principle that the common law enforced a union's own rules, and that unions were free to arrange their affairs, is reflected in the ILO Freedom of Association Convention and in Article 11 of the European Convention on Human Rights, subject to the requirement that regulations "necessary in a democratic society" may be imposed. Unions must have an executive body and that executive must, under the Trade Union and Labour Relations (Consolidation) Act 1992 sections 46 to 56, be elected at least every five years, directly in a secret, equal postal vote of union members.

Union constitutions
The structure of the unions was based in contract, and the rights of members depended on being able to show some proprietary interest to be specifically enforced. This meant that the express terms of the union rule book can, like any contract, be supplemented with implied terms by the courts as strictly necessary to reflect the reasonable expectations of the parties, for instance, by implying the Electoral Reform Service's guidance to say what happens in a tie break situation during an election when the union rules are silent. If there are irregular occurrences in the affairs of the union, for instance if negligence or mismanagement is not alleged and a majority could vote on the issue to forgive them, then members have no individual rights to contest executive decision making. However, if a union's leadership acts ultra vires, beyond its powers set out in the union constitution, if the alleged wrongdoers are in control, if a special supra-majority procedure is flouted, or a member's personal right is broken, the members may bring a derivative claim in court to sue or restrain the executive members. So in Edwards v Halliwell a decision of the executive committee of the National Union of Vehicle Builders to increase membership fees, which were set in the constitution and required a ⅔ majority vote, was able to be restrained by a claim from individual members because this touched both a personal right under the constitution and flouted a special procedure.

Discipline and expulsion
 ASLEF v United Kingdom [2007] ECHR 184
 McVitae v UNISON [1996] IRLR 33
 Roebuck v NUM (Yorkshire Area) No 2 [1978] ICR 676, Templeman J
 Esterman v NALGO [1974] ICR 625, Templeman J
 Radford v NATSOPA [1972] ICR 484, Plowman J

Dispute resolution
 Hamlet v GMBATU [1987] ICR 150, Harman J
 Longley v NUJ [1987] IRLR 109

Union members' rights
 Trade Union and Labour Relations (Consolidation) Act 1992 ss 28–31, true and fair view of accounts, member's right to inspect, and complaints to Certification Officer.
 Trade Union and Labour Relations (Consolidation) Act 1992 ss 62–65, right to require a ballot before industrial action, and no detriment may follow
 Knowles v Fire Brigades Union [1997] ICR 595
 Edwards v Society of Graphical and Allied Trades [1971] Ch 354
 Cheall v APEX [1983] 2 AC 180
 Trade Union and Labour Relations (Consolidation) Act 1992 s 174 
 ASLEF v United Kingdom [2007] ECHR 184
 Amalgamated Society of Railway Servants v Osborne [1910] AC 87, political donations
 Trade Union Act 1913
 Birch v National Union of Railwaymen [1950] Ch 602
 Trade Union and Labour Relations (Consolidation) Act 1992 s 72–73 and 82
 Paul v NALGO [1987] IRLR 413
 Weaver v NATFHE [1988] ICR 599 EAT

Subscriptions
Members' subscriptions are often paid by DOCAS (Deduction of Contributions at Source) i.e. deduction from salary. Implementation of the draft Trade Union (Deduction of Union Subscriptions from Wages in the Public Sector) Regulations 2017 has been delayed until 2019.

Union organisation
 Margaret Thatcher's Conservative government, first elected in 1979, saw trade unions as an obstacle to economic growth and passed legislation of the sort the Conservatives had mostly long avoided.

Membership declined steeply in the 1980s and 1990s, falling from 13 million in 1979 to around 7.3 million in 2000. In 2012, union membership dropped below 6 million for the first time since the 1940s. From 1980 to 1998, the proportion of employees who were union members fell from 52 per cent to 30 per cent.

Union membership declined in parallel with the reduction in size of many traditional industries which had been highly unionised, such as steel, coal, printing, and the docks.

In 2016, the Conservative government passed a new Trade Union Act, which proposes stricter ballot thresholds for industrial action, further restraints on picketing and a requirement that union members contributions to political funds would only be via an ‘opt-in’.

International affiliations
 European Trade Union Confederation
 International Trade Union Confederation

See also

 Conspiracy and Protection of Property Act 1875
 Criminal Law Amendment Act 1871
 Employers and Workmen Act 1875
 GCHQ trade union ban
 History of the socialist movement in the United Kingdom
 History of trade unions in the United Kingdom
 Labour Party (UK) affiliated trade union
 List of trade unions in the United Kingdom
 Student unionism in the United Kingdom
 Trade Union and Labour Party Liaison Organisation
 Trade Union Freedom Bill
 Trade Unionist and Socialist Coalition
 Trades Union Certification Officer
 Union Modernisation Fund

Notes

Further reading
 Adams, W. S. "Lloyd George and the Labour Movement." Past & Present 3 (1953): 55–64.
 Aldcroft, D. H. and Oliver, M. J., eds. Trade Unions and the Economy, 1870–2000. (2000).
 Campbell, A., Fishman, N., and McIlroy, J. eds. British Trade Unions and Industrial Politics: The Post-War Compromise 1945–64 (1999). 
 Charlesworth, Andrew, Gilbert, David, Randall, Adrian, Southall, Humphrey and Wrigley, Chris. An Atlas of Industrial Protest in Britain, 1750–1990 (1996). 
 Clegg, H. A. et al. A History of British Trade Unions Since 1889 (1964) The major scholarly history; highly detailed.
--do.-- A History of British Trade Unions Since 1889: vol. 2 1911–1933. (1985)
--do.--   A History of British Trade Unionism Since 1889, vol. 3: 1934–51 (1994), 
 Davies,  A. J.  To Build a New Jerusalem: Labour Movement from the 1890s to the 1990s  (1996).
 Laybourn, Keith. A history of British trade unionism c. 1770–1990 (1992).
 Minkin,  Lewis. The Contentious Alliance: Trade Unions and the Labour Party (1991) 708 pp  online
 Pelling, Henry. A history of British trade unionism (1987).
 Wrigley, Chris, ed. British Trade Unions, 1945–1995 (Manchester University Press, 1997)
 Wrigley, Chris. British Trade Unions since 1933 (2002) 115 pp online
 Zeitlin, Jonathan. "From labour history to the history of industrial relations." Economic History Review 40.2 (1987): 159–184. Historiography

 Reid, Alistair J. (4 April 2017). "Trade unions and ‘Original Labour’: an alternative to state-socialism". History and Policy. Retrieved 6 May 2017.

External links

Britain's unions. Trades Union Congress (TUC)

 
United Kingdom labour law